Seth Gordon is an American film director, producer, screenwriter, and film editor. He has produced and directed for film and television, including for PBS, the Bill & Melinda Gates Foundation, and the United Nations Staff 1% for Development Fund. His films have screened at the Sundance Film Festival and Slamdance Film Festival. He has directed the films The King of Kong: A Fistful of Quarters (2007), Four Christmases (2008), Horrible Bosses (2011), Identity Thief (2013), and Baywatch (2017). He has also directed several episodes of television series like The Office, Parks and Recreation, Modern Family, Atypical, and For All Mankind.

Life and career
Gordon grew up in Evanston, Illinois. He attended Yale University, where he studied architecture until leaving in 1997 to teach high school for six months in the small village of Shimanyiro, Kenya. While there he helped secure United Nations financing to finish construction of a school, and began filming what would eventually become the documentary Building Shimanyiro. Upon returning to Yale, Gordon taught himself how to edit his footage on an Avid editing machine. Later, he helped shoot Barbara Kopple and Cecilia Peck's Dixie Chicks documentary Shut Up & Sing, and after working as cinematographer, editor and producer on various films, he gained prominence with his documentary The King of Kong: A Fistful of Quarters.

Gordon directed the game company Zynga's "GagaVille" online film in 2010. He co-created and is an executive producer of the Fox television series Breaking In. He directed the 2011 comedy Horrible Bosses, but in August 2013 declined to direct the sequel, citing commitments to the television series The Goldbergs, on which he is an executive producer, and a planned remake of the film WarGames. Gordon directed the pilot of Sneaky Pete for Amazon Studios, which he also produces with Bryan Cranston and David Shore.  A season of episodes has been ordered by Amazon Studios and is in production.

Gordon directed the 2017 film version of Baywatch, starring Dwayne Johnson, Priyanka Chopra and Zac Efron.

He graduated from Lakeside School (Seattle) in 1994 and the Harvard Graduate School of Design.

Television series
In 2009, Gordon developed and directed a video series focusing on the threat posed by cybercrime to Internet users, H*Commerce: The Business of Hacking You, sponsored by antivirus software company McAfee. Gordon has directed various music videos and commercials, and an episode each of Modern Family and Community, two episodes of The Office, and several episodes of Parks and Recreation. He was a director and executive producer on NBC's  Marry Me.  Gordon is a director and executive producer on ABC's The Goldbergs. He also serves as a director and executive producer on the Netflix series Atypical.

Filmography

Film
Director
 Four Christmases (2008)
 Horrible Bosses (2011)
 Identity Thief (2013)
 Baywatch (2017)
 Back in Action (TBA) (Also writer and producer)

Acting credits

Other credits

Documentary films

Television

References

External links

American cinematographers
American documentary filmmakers
American film editors
American television directors
Living people
Writers from Evanston, Illinois
Yale University alumni
Exit Players alumni
Artists from Evanston, Illinois
Harvard Graduate School of Design alumni
Lakeside School alumni
Film directors from Illinois